Broniewski (feminine Broniewska) is a Polish surname. Notable people include:

 Janina Broniewska, Polish writer
 Kajetan Broniewski, Polish rower
 Stanisław Broniewski, Polish economist and scout leader
 Władysław Broniewski, Polish poet and soldier

Polish-language surnames